Aya Danioko (born 10 May 1995), known by her stage name Aya Nakamura, is a Malian-French pop singer. She is best known for her hit song "Djadja".

She was born in Bamako, Mali and emigrated to France with her family, growing up in Aulnay-sous-Bois. Coming from a family of griots, she is the oldest of five siblings. She studied fashion at La Courneuve. She later launched into music with the stage name Aya Nakamura, after the character Hiro Nakamura of the NBC Heroes science fiction drama series.

Nakamura published her music online, gaining a following with "Karma" and "J'ai mal". Dembo Camara, a long-time friend, became her producer and manager. Notably, her song "Brisé", composed by Christopher Ghenda, garnered 34 million views on YouTube, and a duo with rapper Fababy "Love d'un voyou" resulted in her charting in France. She released her debut album with a number of collaborations. She also had a big concert at Stade Modibo Kéïta in Bamako, where she opened for the Nigerian star Davido.

Early life 
Aya Coco Danioko was born in Bamako, Mali on May 10, 1995. She comes from a family of griot, West African storytellers, praise singers, and poets of oral traditions. She is the oldest of five siblings. In her youth her family emigrated to France and moved to   Aulnay-sous-Bois, a suburb North of Paris. She took the stage name Nakamura from the character Hiro Nakamura of the NBC science fiction drama series Heroes, which aired 2006 to 2010.

Career

2014–2017: Debut and first success with Journal intime 
In 2014, at the age of 19, she released her first single "Karma" on Facebook. With the help of the producer |Seysey, she composed a break-up song, "J'ai mal", with a zouk type of melody. The song's video reached more than 1 million YouTube views by that time. An old-time friend, Dembo Camara, became her producer and artistic agent.

In 2016, she made the song "Brisé" with the composer Christopher Ghenda. Then she released another song, "Love d'un Voyou", featuring the rapper Fababy.

As a tribute to her cultural heritage and roots, she did a concert at the Modibo-Keïta stadium in Bamako, opening for the American-Nigerian star Davido. And she dedicated a song to one of the most famous Malian singer Oumou Sangaré, who was born in Bamako just like her.

In January 2016, the singer signed a deal with Rec. 118 and Parlophone, a label from Warner music France. During the same year, she kept on doing collaborations and she released her second single "Super Héros", featuring the rapper Gradur.

On 25 August 2017, she released her debut album Journal Intime, led by her first Platinum hit, "Comportement".

The album was certified Platinum in France]. On 23 September 2017, she participated to La Nuit du Mali in Bercy organized by the Wati-Boss, Dawala in order to celebrate the Independence Day of Mali in Paris. She shared the stage with OumouSangaré and other Malian artists such as Cheick Tidiane Seck, Lassana Hawa or Mokobé among others.

2018–2020: Nakamura 
On 6 April 2018, Aya Nakamura released "Djadja"—the first single from her second album—which stayed two consecutive weeks at number one on the French chart, and was later certified Diamond.

The song quickly became a summer hit in France and soon became an international hit. She became the first French female artist to reach number one in the Netherlands since Edith Piaf with "Non je ne regrette rien" in 1961.

"Djadja" was also the first Francophone song since 2009 to reach the top of the Dutch charts, the last one being "Alors on danse" from Belgian artist Stromae.

"Djadja" then conquered charts and radios all over Europe (Germany, Sweden, Portugal, Spain, Turkey, Romania, Bulgaria, Greece, Spain, Belgium, Switzerland...)

The following single "Copines" released in August 2018 entered at number four in France before climbing to number one in November 2018, and is also certified Diamond.

On 2 November 2018, Aya Nakamura released her second album Nakamura.

In January 2019 she won the European Music Moves Talent Award for Best Urban album.

In February 2019 she was nominated for Song of the Year and Best Urban Album at the France Music Awards.

In April 2019, she released the video for "Pookie", which became the most viewed French video in 2019.

In May 2019, she was portrayed by The New York Times as "one of the most important act in Europe now, musically and socially".

In June 2019, she earned her first nomination at the BET Awards as Best International Act.

In Summer 2019 she gained momentum with the single "Pookie" (with over 240 million YouTube views to date), including high-profile international versions with multi-platinum rappers Capo Plaza and Lil Pump.

In October, "Djadja" went Platinum in Spain and Portugal, while "Pookie" was certified double Platinum in Italy.

On 25 October 2019, Nakamura released a re-issue of the now double platinum Nakamura with five new songs, including the top-five single "40%".

In the December year-end recaps, she was named Most Watched French female artist in 2019 by YouTube, and Most Streamed French female artist in 2019 by Spotify.

On 3 January 2020, she was announced to perform at Coachella Music & Arts Festival 2020.

On 12 June, Nakamura released a Spanish-language version of "Djadja" with Colombian singer Maluma.

2020–2021 
On 17 July 2020, she released the single "Jolie nana" as the lead single from her third studio album Aya. It debuted at number one on the French singles chart, and achieved Gold status in 2 weeks. It also reached the top 10 in Belgium and Switzerland as well as top 40 in the Netherlands. On the UK Afrobeats chart, it reached number 7. 

On the 9th of October, she released the second single from the album, "Doudou". It peaked at number 6 in France, in the top 40 in Belgium and number 16 on the UK Afrobeats chart.

She announced the album on 15 October, with a release date of 13 November. The tracklist was released on 4 October, revealing collaborations with Stormzy, Ms Banks and Oboy. 

In 2021, Nakamura was featured in the music video for ‘Sans Moi,’ a track in the Franglish's album Vibe, and in the music video for ‘C’est Cuit’ by Major Lazer. Her cover of Vogue France was chosen as the favorite cover of 2021.

Personal life 
Nakamura has two daughters, named Aïcha and Ava.

In 2022, Nakamura, along with her ex-partner Vladimir Boudnikoff, was charged with reciprocal domestic violence. On November 11, 2022, her trial was adjourned, since neither she nor Boudnikoff appeared in court.

Discography

Albums

Singles

As lead artist

As featured artist

*Did not appear in the official Belgian Ultratop 50 charts, but rather in the bubbling under Ultratip charts.

Other charted songs

Awards and nominations

Notes

References

1995 births
Living people
French people of Malian descent
People from Bamako
People from Seine-Saint-Denis
Warner Music France artists
21st-century French women singers